Bank of the Orient is a bank catering to Asian Americans in the United States.

Headquartered in San Francisco, with branch offices in California, Honolulu, and Xiamen, the bank is privately held and was established on March 17, 1971.

The first solely owned Asian American bank to be launched in California since World War II, Bank of the Orient was founded by Ernest Go, a Chinese Filipino whose family was successful in the international banking business. The bank originally served the local Chinese and Asian communities in San Francisco, where most of its branch offices are still located today, and with its success, the bank gradually expanded into Hawaii.

Bank of the Orient is one of the first to venture into the growing Chinese market and its Xiamen branch office has been in business since the mid-1990s.

External links
 Bank of the Orient

Banks based in California
Banks established in 1971
Chinese American banks
Chinese-American culture in Honolulu
Chinese-American culture in San Francisco
Companies based in San Francisco
Filipino-American culture in California
Filipino-American culture in Honolulu
Privately held companies based in California
Privately held companies based in Hawaii
American companies established in 1971
1971 establishments in California